The family of Al Faiz, also transliterated in a number of other ways, including Al Fa'iz, Al Fa'ez, Al Faez, or Al Fayez, is the oldest Alid family of Karbala, which they have occupied, on some occasions ruled, and held custodianship of its holy sites, since 861.

They are the descendants of Ibrahim al-Mujab, the 9th-century grandson of the seventh Shi'ite Imam, Musa al-Kadhim. Their eponymous ancestor is considered to be Muhammad Abu al-Faiz, the 12th great-grandson of al-Mujab. In Karbala, the family holds a high prestige where they maintained the authority of the niqaba (supervision) of Karbala's Sayyids and the sidana (custodianship) of Karbala's holy sites numerous times over different periods.

The family is currently known by the families of Al Tumah, Al Nasrallah, Al Dhiya al-Din, Al Tajir, Al Awj, and Al Sayyid Amin.

History

Alid settlement in Karbala 
After al-Mutawakkil was killed in 861, the Alids found peace under his son, al-Muntasir, who helped keep them safe and protect them. The first known Alid to settle in Karbala was Ibrahim al-Mujab bin Muhammad al-Abid bin Musa al-Kadhim, also known as Taj al-Din Ibrahim al-Mujab.

Sidana and Niqaba 

The sidana was passed down from al-Mujab to his eldest son, Muhammad, nicknamed al-Ha'iri, as they lived in the Ha'ir (another name for Karbala), in 913. This then kept being passed on down as follows:

 Ahmed Abu al-Tayyib (962–995)
 Ali al-Majthoor (995–1029)
 Ahmed al-Ha'iri (1029–1068)
 Ibrahim al-Ha'iri (1068–1097)
 After Ibrahim, a sayyid from the descendants of Ali Zayn al-Abidin took the sidana, and later many different figures, until it returned to the descendants of al-Mujab with Muhammad Abu al-Faiz in 1259.

In the late 10th century, the naqib (supervisor of) al-ashraf (the descendants of Muhammad) i.e. the head or supervisor of the descendants of the Islamic prophet Muhammad, which is known as the niqaba, was established, in Karbala, during the Buyid era. Muhammad al-Husayni, a descendant of Zayn al-Abidin, took the niqaba and became the first naqib of the Ha'ir. After al-Husayni, Sharaf al-Din Ahmed, a descendant of al-Mujab took over as naqib in c. 985. His son, Ibrahim al-Ha'iri then took over in 1001, and then when he died in 1049, it went to other sayyids, until it returned to Muhammad Abu al-Faiz in 1259.

It is also worthy to mention, that the niqaba and sidana in Karbala at some points in time, were merged, so whoever held the niqaba, would also be  of the two holy shrines.

Tribal feud 
By 1317, the Ilkhanate state was disintegrating. This left the Euphrates region without a stable government. Karbala then split into two factions, Al Faiz and Al Zuhayk. The Faiz tribe were descendants of Muhammad al-Abid bin Musa al-Kadhim, and the Zuhayk tribe were descendants of Ibrahim al-Asghar bin Musa al-Kadhim. The city witnessed a feud that lasted for nearly half a century. The famous Moroccan traveller, Ibn Battuta, witnessed the unrest when he visited Karbala in 1326.

Al Faiz is older in residence in Karbala, since Ibrahim al-Mujab moved to Karbala in 861 during the rule of al-Muntasir. Many branches of descendants were formed from al-Mujab, but it was Muhammad Abu al-Faiz that later stood out and became their patriarch in Karbala. One must also understand that, the feud began during the late life of Abu al-Faiz, meaning his tribe couldn't have consisted of just his descendants, but rather, he had united all of his cousins under his name.

As for Al Zuhayk, they are named after their patriarch Yahya Zuhayk, great-great-great-grandson of Abdullah al-Ha'iri, the naqib of the Talibids that moved to Karbala in the early 11th-century. All of the al-Asghar descendants had united under their cousin, Zheek's name. Al Zuhayk today is known by the families of Al Thabit, Al Daraj (later Al Naqib), and Al Wahab. The Al Eshaiker and Al Jolokhan families were cousins of Al Zuhayk, and also took under their name.

Al Faiz believed that the niqaba of Karbala belonged to them because they were the older residing family, whilst Al Zuhayk believed it belonged to them because they previously held the niqaba of the Talibids of Iraq.

Due to the continuous chaos as a result of the feud, as well as the destabilisation of the central government, a tribe, by the name of, Al Muhanna, claimed they wanted to end the unrest and used this excuse to invade Karbala in 1355. They took full control of the city and the holy sites. Shihab al-Din Al Muhanna declared himself the naqib of the Ha'ir. When Al Faiz and Al Zuhayk realised what had happened, they decided to put aside their disputes, unite, and revolt against the invading al-Muhanna tribe. With their rebellion, they managed to oust the naqib, and exile him and his tribe, out of the city. The two tribes also married from each other to further forge the two factions.

Dress 
In the 9th century, the Alids of Karbala dressed in traditional Arabic garments (turban, thawb and bisht) that came in various colours, although green was the more common colour. Later in 1372, Sultan Shaban introduced a kind of nobility with the privilege of wearing green turbans for the Alids; and to distinguish them from the Abbasid's black symbol.

With the rise of the popularity of the fez in the 19th century, in Ottoman Iraq, Nasir Nasrallah imported fez's from Vienna, and green shawl wool from England, and created what is now known as a kashida (a fez with a green scarf wrapped around it). The kashida along with a jubba (long coat with sleeves, similar to a cassock but without buttons), became the dress code of the Faizids, which was then adopted and turned into the official attire of the s and servants of the Husayn and Abbas shrines', and it quickly spread to the rest of the shrine cities of Iraq.

The kashida's differ slightly between Karbala and other cities. In Karbala, the wrapped green scarf is much longer and takes up half of the fez, and it is wrapped in a way that overlaps, allowing the front side to be distinctive. However, in Najaf, the wrap is shorter, but there is still an overlap, whilst in Samarra, it is much shorter, and there is no overlap in the wrap, forming a consistent line.

Figures 
It is worthy to note that the notable figures of Al Faiz had the addition of al-Husayni (descendants of Husayn) to their name until the 16th century. This then changed to al-Musawi (descendants of Musa) in the following centuries.

Muhammad Abu al-Faiz 
He is: Moḥammed Abu al-Faʾiz bin Abu al-Ḥassan ʿAli bin Aḥmed Jalal al-Din bin Abu Jaʿfar Moḥammed bin Abu Jaʿfar Moḥammed  bin Abu Jaʿfar Najm al-Din al-Aswad bin Abu Jaʿfar Moḥammed bin ʿAli al-Ghareeq bin Moḥammed al-Khair bin Abu al-Ḥassan ʿAli al-Majthoor bin Abu al-Ṭayyib Aḥmed bin Moḥammed al-Ḥaʾiri bin Ibrahim al-Mujāb bin Moḥammed al-ʿAābid bin Musa al-Kāthim.He is the progenitor of the Tumah, Nasrallah, Dhiya al-Din, Tajir, Awj and Sayyid Amin families. He is reported to have been a valiant and noble man, followed by the majority of the city. He was the one that united all of the branches from the descendants of al-Mujab, that resided in Karbala, under his name. Abu al-Faiz owned vast lands across Karbala and Shfatha. In 1259, under the rule of Hulegu, he was made naqib and ruler of Karbala, at the behest of al-Muhaqqiq al-Hilli. He died in c. 1317.

Ahmed Shams al-Din al-Faizi 

He was the son of Abu al-Faiz. He was appointed Minister of Ras al-Ayn (Ayn al-Tamr) in 1334 until his death in 1349.

Muhammad Sharaf al-Din al-Faizi 
He was the son of Ahmed Shams al-Din. After the exile of the al-Muhanna tribe in the last third of the 14th-century, Muhammad was made ruler of Karbala. In 1393, when Timur Lang's forces, under the command of his son Miran Shah, defeated Ahmed Jalayir, they entered Karbala, to which they were met with its noblemen, headed by Muhammad who was ruling the city.

In 1412, tensions grew between the Alid and non-Alid tribes as to the matters of the shrines'. For this reason Muhammad formed a number of groups, each representing a tribe, and designated a sarkoshk (leading minister) to lead each group.

Tumah I Kamal al-Din al-Faizi 
He was the son of Ahmed III Abu Tiraas, the son of Yahya Dhiya al-Din, the son of Muhammad Sharaf al-Din. In 1423, Tumah I assumed the niqaba of the ashraf of Karbala, as well as the sidana of the Husayn and Abbas shrines' at the behest of the governor of Baghdad, Shah Muhammad, of the Black Sheep Turcomen tribe. Tumah died in 1442.

Sharaf al-Din al-Faizi 
He was the son of Tumah I. Sharaf al-Din took the niqaba and sidana after his father, died in 1442, during the Black Sheep monarchy, and carried on during the White Sheep monarchy. He passed down the niqaba and sidana to his son, Yahya, in 1493. He died in 1500. Iraqi historian, Dr. Imad Rauf in his book, al-Usar al-Hakima, mentions he holds a document that has both Sharaf al-Din's name and Sultan Yaqub's, dated from 1455.

Yahya al-Faizi 
He was the son of Sharaf al-Din. In 1493, Yahya took charge of the niqaba and sidana after his father. He died in 1536.

Taj al-Din al-Faizi 
He was the son of Tumah I. After the death of his nephew, Yahya in 1536, Taj al-Din took charge of the niqaba and sidana. He was naqib and  until his death in 1556.

Alam al-Din al-Faizi 
He was the son of Tumah II, the son of Sharaf al-Din. In 1573, the Sublime Porte issued a firman, appointing Alam al-Din as the minister of Charitable Endowments of Karbala. In November, 1589, he signed a power of attorney over all of his possessions to his son, Jameel; the document was witnessed by Muhammad-Ali al-Eshaiker and four other noblemen. He died in 1598.

Nasrallah al-Faizi 

He was the son of Husayn, the son of Ali, the son of Yunis, the son of Jameel, the son of Alam al-Din. Nasrallah was a senior jurist, teacher, poet, author and annalist. He was the patriarch of the Nasrallah family.

Mehdi al-Faizi 
He was the son of Hasan, the son of Mansur, the son of Nasir al-Din, the son of Yunis, the son of Jameel, the son of Alam al-Din. He was made  of the Husayn shrine in 1752, until his death in 1790.

Muhammad-Ali 'Abu Ridin' al-Faizi 
He was the son of Muhammad-Musa, the son of Darwish, the son of Sharaf al-Din III, the son of Abbas, the son of Hashim, the son of Muhammad, the son of Sharaf al-Din (naqib and ). He was named Abu Ridin as he used to wear a unique cassock-like dress, similar to ones worn by knights and leaders. However, when the governor of Baghdad, Dawud Pasha returned from the Ottoman-Persian war, he replaced Abu Ridin with Wahab Tumah in 1823. Abu Ridin had a large role in the Battle of Menakhur in 1826, and because of the Karbalaeis victory over the Ottomans, he was reinstated in August 1826. He died in 1829.

Al Tumah 
Al Tumah branched off Tumah III al-Faizi. They own the famous muqata'a Fidan al-Sada which Tumah III endowed to his descendants on September 26, 1616, after it was granted to him by Sheikh Ahmed al-Nahawi. It is worthy to note that, it is a khairi endowment, i.e. devoted to a charitable purpose from its inception, rather than for the benefit of his descendants. The family held custodianship of the Husayn shrine numerously throughout the last four centuries. It is currently one of the largest Alid families in Karbala. The family branched into five clans:
 Al Wahab
 Al Mustafa (from this clan branched out Al Qotob, Al Fathallah and Al Urzuq)
 Al Darwish (from this clan branched out Al Killidar, Al Sarkhadamah, and Al Rozekhan)
 Al Muhammad (from this clan branched out Al Shurufi and Al Khemgeh)
 Al Jawad

Notable members 

 Khalifah Nimatullah Tumah (died 1697) was the grandson of Tumah III, he became the first of the descendants of Tumah III to hold the niqaba of Karbala, and this was in 1680. His grandson, Abbas also became naqib in 1773, but he died two months later.
A plague epidemic in Iraq led to his death on August 29, 1846.
His descendants took his epithet - al-Killidar (holder of the key) - as their family name, and are known as 'al-Killidar' or 'al-Killidar Tumah'.
Muhammad-Hassan Kadhim Tumah (1864–1945) was a religious scholar and orator. He was a leader in the Iraqi revolt of 1920, and the first person to raise the Arab (Iraqi) flag over Karbala's civic centre, causing his arrest by the British. He was freed at the behest of a senior cleric. He died whilst on pilgrimage to Imam Ridha in Mashhad, in 1945, and his corpse was returned and buried in Karbala.
He was also an author, and wrote a number of books, including Baghiyat al-Nubala Fi Tarikh Karbala and Nash'at al-Adyan al-Samawiya.
Dr. Abd al-Jawad Ali al-Killidar (1892–1959) was a doctor in Islamic history, and authored a number of books on the history of Karbala, including Tarikh Karbala and Ha'ir al-Husayn. He founded the al-Ahrar newspaper in the 1930s.
Abd al-Razzaq Abd al-Wahaab al-Wahaab (1895–1958) was a distinguished writer and publisher, most famous for his three volume book, Karbala Fi al-Tarikh (Karbala in History).
Muhammad-Hassan Mustafa al-Killidar (1913–1995) was a celebrated author, most famous for his book Madinat al-Husayn (City of Hussain) which narrates a great deal of detail about the history of Karbala in numerous volumes. He was an advocate for women's rights, and issued a chain of articles titled 'The necessity of liberating women according to Islam'.
 Dr. Saleh Jawad Tumah (born 1929) is a doctor of Arabic and Comparative Literature. He is professor emeritus of East Asian Languages and Cultures at Indiana University, and has been associated with the university since 1964.
 Salman Hadi Tumah (born 1935) is a renowned author and poet. He is a graduate of Baghdad University's college of education, with many leading books on the history and culture of Karbala, as well as its notable figures.
 Dr. Adnan Jawad Tumah (born 1941) is a doctor in Language. He is a professor at Philipps-Universität Marburg. He has authored a number of books and publications, focusing on Arabic calligraphy and religious manuscripts.

Al Nasrallah 
Al Nasrallah branched off Nasrallah al-Faizi. They own vast lands across Shfatha (now Ayn al-Tamur) and Karbala. Their grandfather Yunis al-Faizi excelled in business, and managed to purchase the muqata'a Maal Yunis which extended from the borders of Arba' Nahran to al-Jayya to Umm al-'Agareeg in Bab al-Salalma. He endowed his muqata'a to his descendants for their benefit. The family at some point held custodianship of the Husayn and Abbas shrines, and is the only Alid family that had the right to serve in both shrines. It is also the only Alid family to have three designated crypts in the Husayn shrine, the first is behind the grave of Ibrahim al-Mujab, opposite the Royal Qajari crypt, the second is besides the qatlgah (place where Husayn was slaughtered), and the third is near the tomb of Husayn's companions. It is also one of the largest Alid families in Karbala. The family branched into five clans:

 Al Muhammad
 Al Ahmed
 Al Tawil
 Al Salih
 Al Muhammad-Ali

Notable members 

His descendants took his epithet - al-Tawil (the tall) - as their family name, and are known as 'al-Tawil' or 'al-Tawil Nasrallah'.
 Ali Ahmed Nasrallah was a custodian of the Imam Husayn shrine, and a co-founder of the Coalition Party in 1907, that sought to challenge the Ottoman government in Iraq, and eventually topple it.
Baqir Salih Nasrallah (died 1886) was an Islamic missionary, that played a big role in the conversion of many of Talafar to Shia Islam. He was known to have a remarkable level of physical strength, it is narrated on the account of Sayyid Ibrahim al-Isfahani in Sayyid Muhammad al-Hindi an-Najafi's kashkool (diary), that "Sayyid Baqir was known for his exceptional strength, for he would stand on one leg on the edge of a well, and no man would be able to push him into the well.".
 Muhammad 'Hammoud' Sultan Nasrallah (died 1901) was head of the traders of Karbala in the Ottoman era, before the introduction of the chamber of commerce. He was an affluent man, and owned a whole parade along Bayn al-Haramayn. He was married to Amna Thabit, the granddaughter of Muhammad-Ali Thabit, the 10th  of the Abbas shrine, as well as the great-granddaughter of Dowlatshah .
Hassan Hammoud Nasrallah (1881–1959) was an activist, and affluent businessman. He was a member of the High Council of Military Affairs during the Iraqi revolt of 1920. He continued his activism in Iraqi Renaissance Party until it was disbanded in the late 1920s.
Hashem Husayn Nasrallah (died 1959) was a socialite, and political activist. He was active in his resistance to the British in the 1920 revolt, and worked closely with Muhammad Sa'id al-Habboubi. He later became the representative of grand Ayatollah Hakim in Karbala. After his death, his brother, Sayyid Rasheed became the representative of Hakim.
 Dr. Murtadha Nasir Nasrallah (1922–2005) was a doctor of law, he worked as a professor at the University of Baghdad's business school. He was a celebrated author, writing some of the leading books on corporation law.
 Hashem Hassan Nasrallah (1923–1997) was the chairman of the Karbala Chamber of Commerce for six terms from 1959 to 1969. He supervised al-Iqtisad magazine that issued its first magazine on 15 July 1960. He founded the Chamber's library in 1963.
Muhammad-Husayn Muhammad-Ali Nasrallah (born 1951) is a judge, prosecutor, and served as the president of the courts of appeal in four different Iraqi provinces, as well as a general Judicial Supervisor. He is currently the chief of the Nasrallah family.
Dr. Hasan Ali Nasrallah (born 1951) is a doctor of internal medicine, and the dean of the Medical College of the University of Karbala. He completed his primary studies in the Hashemiyah School in 1963, and his secondary studies in Baghdad College in 1968. He graduated from the University of Baghdad in 1974 with a degree in Medicine. He received a diploma in internal medicine from the same university in 1987. He obtained Arab Board certification in Internal Medicine at Yarmouk University in 1988. He has served as a specialist doctor at the Husayni Hospital since 1988, and held numerous positions there, including director of the hospital between 1994–95 and 2003–05.
He is also an author with many published books, mostly about the history and culture of Karbala.
Dr. Hashim Muhammad al-Tawil (born 1955) is a doctor of art history, he is the Tenured Professor and Chair of Art History Area Studies at Henry Ford College, Dearborn, MI. He has also been an advisory board member at the Arab Cultural Studies Program in Henry Ford College since 2011, and a board of directors member in the Asian & Islamic Art Forum of the Detroit Institute of Arts since 2006.
Aref Muhammad Nasrallah (born 1958) is a social activist, he is the chairman of the al-Wala' wal-Fida' wal-Fath Association. He is currently the director of Ayatollah Shirazi's public relations office in Iraq.

Al Dhiya al-Din 
Al Dhiya al-Din branched off Dhiya al-Din al-Faizi. They own lands in Umm Ramila in Shfatha, and in Karbala, they own the famous Dhway grove, which they were on some occasions named after. In 1799, the grove was endowed by Yahya, to his son, Dhiya al-Din and his descendants, for the benefit of the Husayn Shrine. In 1953, it was purchased by the city council, and made a public park. The family held the custodianship of the Abbas shrine numerous times throughout the 20th century.

Notable members 

When his father died, he was still too young to take on the duty of the sidana, so it was held by Muhammad-Mehdi Tumah until he was reported to the governor of Baghdad, Abd al-Rahman Pasha. Abd al-Rahman reinstated Murtadha, upon receiving the news. He also issued a firman to solidify Murtadha's position, however, his uncle Abbas Dhiya al-Din took responsibility, until Murtadha came of age, as he was only ten years old.
He retired from his responsibilities in 1982.
Ahmed Abbod Dhiya al-Din (died 2015) was a renowned merchant. He opened a number of businesses in mulk (parade) Al Nasrallah. He is the first person to bring the radio and television to Karbala.  He was known as balur (crystal) because he owned a large crystal store. He was the chief of the Dhiya al-Din family until his death.

Al Tajir 
Al Tajir branched off Ali 'al-Tajir' al-Faizi. Ali was named al-Tajir (the merchant), due to his frequent travels to East Asia for trade. The family owns farms known as Umm al-Sudan in mahalat Al Faiz (now known as al-Hayabi), that Hassan al-Tajir endowed to his descendants in 1680. The family served in the holy Husayn and Abbas shrines'.

Notable members 

 Muhammad Ali Tajir was the sarkoshk of the Ha'iri group of custodians of the two shrines in the late 19th century.
 Ali Muhammad-Ali Tajir (born 1962) is a painter and art historian. He studied at the College of Fine Arts at the University of Baghdad, ultimately earning a master's degree in drawing. He is currently a celebrated artist with his award-winning series, ‘Babylon’, which fuses scenes from daily urban life in Iraq with symbolic characters and objects.

Al Awj 
Al Awj branched off Muhsin Awj al-Faizi, who branched off Msa'id al-Faizi. They have a partful ownership in Tumah III's Fidan al-Sada muqata'a. They also own parts of the farms known as Maal al-Saghir, in mahalat Al Faiz, endowed in 1847 and Maal Ju'an, near mahalat Al Faiz, endowed in 1853. The family served in the holy Husayn and Abbas shrines'.

Notable members 

 Abd al-Amir Jawad Awj (1958–2011) was an author and poet. He obtained a BSc in Project Planning and Management and pursued a career in writing and journalism. He has authored numerous books, including leading books on genealogy and Islamic folklore. He disappeared in 2011, and has been missing since.

Al Sayyid Amin (Jolokhan) 
Al Sayyid Amin branched off Muhammad-Amin al-Faizi, also known as Sayyid Amin al-Faizi. They also own lands in Ayn al-Tamur that Muhammad-Amin endowed to his descendants in 1703. The family have an official Ottoman firman confirming this. The family served in the holy Husayn and Abbas shrines'. In the late 19th century, they became known as Al Jolokhan al-Faizi, as there was a large open space near where they lived, and in Persian it was known as a jolokhan. They are not to be mistaken by Al Jolokhan from Al Zuhayk, who also lived near the jolokhan, in Bab al-Taag.

Notable members 

Murtadha Baqir Sayyid-Amin was a nobleman and leader. He was a celebrated warrior during the Battle of Menakhur in 1826. He headed the Bab al-Mukhayyam battalion, and managed to keep the Ottomans out of the city for most of the battle.
Muhammad Baqir Sayyid-Amin was a member of the board of governors of Karbala in 1885 until 1889.
Muhammad Muhammad-Ali Jolokhan (1928–2007) was a renowned cleric and orator. He was the maternal grandson of grand Ayatollah Muhammad-Husayn al-Shahrestani.
Hasan Muhammad-Ali Jolokhan (born 1934) was a theatrical producer, director, and actor. His theatrical career started in the 1940s, and by 1960, headed the theatrical movement in Karbala.

Family Tree 
Sources:

References 

History of Karbala
Arab dynasties
Iraqi families
Iraqi noble families